Eric Heffler is an American former ice hockey goaltender who was an All-American for St. Lawrence.

Career
After playing junior hockey in Canada, Heffler returned to New York to play college hockey at St. Lawrence. He started his career as the team's third goaltender and then progressively earned more playing time in net. He became the primary netminder as a junior and then backstopped the team to a massive improvement as a senior. St. Lawrence won more than twice as many games in Heffler's final season and he was one of the top goaltenders in the nation in both goals against average and save percentage. St. Lawrence finished second in the ECAC Hockey standings and was ranked #10 in the country while Hellfer was named an All-American and the ECAC Hockey Player of the Year. He helped the team earn an NCAA Tournament bid for the first time in seven years but, unfortunately, couldn't help them win the match.

Though undrafted, Heffler embarked on a professional career after graduating and quickly found himself in the NHL. The next year, when Edmonton's primary netminder, Bill Ranford, contracted an ear infection, Heffler was called up to serve as a backup behind Tommy Salo. He sat on the bench for two games in late-November before Ranford returned to action. Heffler would later joke about the situation:

“I was hoping to get home for Thanksgiving, but this is a good reason not too.”

In the AHL, Heffler was the co-starter for the Hamilton Bulldogs and had a mediocre season. While his numbers weren't any worse than any other of the team's goaltenders, he was relegated to being the team's third goaltender during their playoff run. In his second full season of pro hockey, Heffler's performance declined, but he still earned a second call-up to the Oilers, this time for one game. Afterwards he slid down the depth chart and was eventually demoted to the ECHL. In the second half of the season he didn't appear to be improving, so Heffler ended up playing single-A hockey the year after. He split time between two teams and retired after the year.

Heffler was inducted into the St. Lawrence Athletic Hall of Fame in 2019.

Statistics

Regular season and playoffs

Awards and honors

References

External links

1976 births
Living people
AHCA Division I men's ice hockey All-Americans
American men's ice hockey goaltenders
Ice hockey people from New York (state)
People from Geneva, New York
St. Lawrence Saints men's ice hockey players
Hamilton Bulldogs (AHL) players
Greensboro Generals players
New Haven Knights players
B.C. Icemen players